Farragut Park is a public park in the Piedmont neighborhood of Portland, Oregon. It is bordered by North Kerby Avenue, Farragut Street, and the railway line. 

The 14-acre park contains a playground, a baseball diamond, basketball courts, a water playground, accessible restrooms, and picnic tables. 

Acquired in 1940, the park, like the adjacent street, was named after David Farragut, a naval officer in the American Civil War.

See also

 List of parks in Portland, Oregon

References

1940 establishments in Oregon
North Portland, Oregon
Parks in Portland, Oregon
Piedmont, Portland, Oregon
Protected areas established in 1940